Italo Viglianesi (1 January 1916 – 19 January 1995) was an Italian trade unionist politician and syndicalist.

Viglianesi was born in Caltagirone, Italy.  In 1950, he was one of the founders and first general secretary of Italian Labour Union (UIL)  one of the biggest Italian trade union centers. He was minister of transport from 27 March 1970 to 17 February 1972 under Mariano Rumor and Emilio Colombo cabinets representing the Italian Socialist Party (PSI). He was senator from 1963 to 1979 when he retired. He was vice-president of the Italian Senate for 1 year. He died in Rome, aged 79.

See also
Italian Labour Union

Notes

External links
Viglianesi file of Legislature IV of Italy from senato.it
Viglianesi file of Legislature V of Italy from senato.it
Viglianesi file of Legislature VI of Italy from senato.it
Viglianesi file of Legislature VII of Italy from senato.it

1916 births
1995 deaths
Italian trade unionists
Italian syndicalists
Transport ministers of Italy
Italian Democratic Socialist Party politicians
20th-century Italian politicians